Mosese Luveitasau Yabakitini (born 23 March 1980 in Suva) is a Fijian rugby union footballer. He is a current Fijian international, and is one of the rising stars of the team. He used to play professional rugby in Wales for Celtic League-side Cardiff Blues leaving after one season.  He signed for Cardiff from Fijian Club RFC Rosi in the summer of 2006. He plays as a Winger; he is a prolific hard tackler with very good acceleration despite his small stature.

Mosese or "Moji" as he is known was a Fijian 15's trialist in 2002 and 2003. He was Fiji's top scorer in domestic rugby in 2003 after playing 13 out of 16 games for his province. Despite this, his First Cap came in the Pacific Tri-Nations clash against Samoa in July 2005. Since then he has appeared quite regularly for Fiji.

References 
Cardiff Blues Homepage
BBC Sport
Wales vs Fiji match programme 11 November 2005

1980 births
Living people
Fijian rugby union players
Cardiff Rugby players
Fiji international rugby union players
Fijian expatriate rugby union players
Expatriate rugby union players in Wales
Fijian expatriate sportspeople in Wales
Sportspeople from Suva
I-Taukei Fijian people
Rugby union wings